The commune of Gitobe is a commune of Kirundo Province in northern Burundi. The capital lies at Gitobe.

References

Communes of Burundi
Kirundo Province